Michal Towber (born August 30, 1980, in Ashkelon, Israel) is an Israeli singer and composer. Signed to Columbia/Sony at the age of 17, she has released three CDs, Sky with Stars, Coma and Lovesick.

In 2005, as part of the music composition staff of the American soap opera One Life to Live, Towber shared the team's Emmy Award for Outstanding Achievement in Music Direction and Composition for a Drama Series. The team was nominated for the award in 2002, 2004, 2006, and 2007. Towber was nominated for Best Original Song for "Tissue Paper Wings" in 2002.

References

External links 
 Michal Towber official site

1980 births
Living people
Israeli women songwriters
Israeli women composers
21st-century Israeli women singers
Daytime Emmy Award winners
People from Ashkelon